%s may refer to:

C string 
 %s, in printf format string
 %s, in scanf format string

System time 
 %s, seconds in the strftime format string
 %s, used to check the Unix timestamp

Web browsers and websites  	
 a marker in a smart bookmark showing where to insert an argument string